"Le Mal de toi" is a 1986 song recorded by French singer François Feldman. It was written by Jean-Marie Moreau and Feldman and was released in December 1988 as the fifth and last single from the album Vivre, Vivre, released the previous year, on which it appears as the ninth track. It provided Feldman second top ten hit in France and the second best-selling single from the album, behind "Slave".

The song was included on Feldman's three best of compilations but in the live version recorded during the 1991 tour at Bercy: first on Two Feldman (1996) on which it appears as the eighth track on the second CD, then on Best Feldman (1998) as the 14th track, last on Gold (2008) as the eighth track on the second CD; it was also included on the live album Feldman à Bercy (1992).

Chart performance
In France, "Le Mal de toi" debuted at number 40 on the chart edition of 11 February 1998, reached a peak of number nine six weeks later, totalled two weeks in the top ten and 16 weeks in the top 50. It achieved Silver status, awarded by the Syndicat National de l'Édition Phonographique, the French certificator, for over 200,000 units. On the European Hot 100 Singles, it entered at number 91 on 11 March 1989, reached number 35, its highest position, in its fifth week, and fell off the chart after 12 weeks of presence.

Track listings
 7" single
 "Le Mal de toi" (single version) — 4:18
 "Le Mal de toi" (symphonic version) — 2:58

 12" maxi
 "Le Mal de toi" (album version) — 5:30
 "Le Mal de toi" (symphonic version) — 2:58
 "Elle me rend barbare" — 3:25

 CD maxi
 "Le Mal de toi" (album version) — 5:30
 "Elle me rend barbare" — 3:25
 "Suis-moi jusqu'au vertige" (remix version) — 4:58
 "Le Mal de toi" (symphonic version) — 2:58

Charts and certifications

Weekly charts

Certifications

Release history

References

1986 songs
1989 singles
François Feldman songs
Black-and-white music videos